Filip "Fića" Vujić ( born  October 17, 1989 in Belgrade, SR Serbia, Yugoslavia) is a Serbian volleyball player (libero). He was a member of the national team at the 2011 European Championship when Serbia won the gold medal.

External links
 profile at CEV
 profile at FIVB

Living people
1989 births
Sportspeople from Belgrade
Serbian men's volleyball players
European champions for Serbia